Publicis & Hal Riney is an American advertising agency, founded in San Francisco in 1977 by Hal Riney as Hal Riney & Partners. He had previously led the west coast office of Ogilvy & Mather since 1976.

They are best known for their award-winning work on Saturn automobiles and HP. Other notable campaigns have been for Sprint, Crocker Bank, Perrier, Alamo Rent A Car, Henry Weinhard's, E & J Gallo Winery (specifically Bartles & Jaymes). Riney had previously created and narrated the noted Morning in America and Bear in the woods television commercials for the successful Ronald Reagan 1984 Presidential re-election campaign.

The agency was purchased by Publicis in 1998. In 1999, materials created by Publicis & Hal Riney for the Cartoon Network animated series Dexter's Laboratory were released in Subway stores as part of a promotion called "Dexter's Super Computer Giveaway".

In 2008, the agency was awarded a Gold Lion at the Cannes Lions International Advertising Festival for its work on a website for AAA. Current clients include U.S. Cellular, Chimay, Pogo.com, HP, Compaq and Walmart.

References

Advertising agencies of the United States
Companies based in San Francisco
1977 establishments in California